Alexander Nikolaevich Ryadinsky (born April 1, 1978) is a Belarusian professional ice hockey player who participated at the 2010 IIHF World Championship as a member of the Belarus National men's ice hockey team.

Career statistics

Regular season and playoffs

International

References

1978 births
Living people
Ice hockey players at the 2010 Winter Olympics
Olympic ice hockey players of Belarus
Ice hockey people from Minsk
Belarusian ice hockey defencemen